The following is a list of Trinidad and Tobago FA Trophy winners, since its inception in 1927. The FA Trophy, is a knockout cup competition in Trinidad and Tobago football, organised by the Trinidad and Tobago Football Association. It is the oldest football competition in Trinidad and Tobago. The tournament is open to all clubs in the top three levels of the football pyramid. The competition culminates in January with the FA Trophy final, which has traditionally been regarded as the showpiece finale of the Trinidad and Tobago football season.

The record for the most wins is held by Maple Club and Malvern United, with seven victories, followed by Defence Force and United British Oilfields Trinidad with six, United Petrotrin with five, and Shamrock, Casuals, Everton, and W Connection with four. The cup has been won by the same team in two or more consecutive years on nine occasions, and seven teams. In fact, Everton remains the only club to have won the trophy four consecutive years from 1929–1932. The current holders of the FA Trophy are North East Stars, who defeated fellow Pro League side W Connection in the 2014–15 final on 29 March 2015.

Finals
Until 1999, a draw in the final would result in the match being replayed at a later date. However, if the replay resulted in another draw or the replay could not be scheduled, then the two teams shared the trophy. The lone exception occurred in 1985 when Defence Force defeated Trintoc by a penalty shootout following extra time. Since then the final has always been decided on the day, with a penalty shootout as required. So far, a penalty shootout has been required on only three occasions, in the 2000, 2003, and 2006 finals.

Results

Results by team

References

External links
Trinidad and Tobago Football History
Trinidad and Tobago - List of Cup Winners, RSSSF.com (see the section "FA Cup")

Trinidad and Tobago Cup